Buksa may refer to:

 Buksa people, an ethnic group of India
 Buksa language, an Indo-Aryan language

People with the surname
 Adam Buksa (born 1996), Polish footballer
 Aleksander Buksa (born 2003), Polish footballer 
 Nataliya Buksa (born 1996), Ukrainian chess player
 Sindija Bukša (born 1997), Latvian sprinter

See also 
 Buxa, West Bengal, India
 Boksa (disambiguation)

Language and nationality disambiguation pages